The North Hants Senior League was a football competition based in Hampshire, England and was administered by the North Hants FA.

History

The League was founded in 1968, by the North Hants FA, to bridge the gap between the Hampshire League and its three local Junior leagues; the Basingstoke & District League and the now defunct Andover & District League and the Winchester & District League.

During its heyday, the competition was much respected and for a spell ran with two divisions. The league consisted mainly of village sides and of the reserve teams of many Hampshire League clubs. Like many other leagues at this level, it lost many teams during the late Nineties/early millennium, when leagues higher up expanded - mainly by introducing Combination Divisions for their reserve sides.

After a further decline in numbers, the competition folded in 2004 following the expansion of the Wessex League and the consequent formation of the Hampshire League 2004. Prior to this, it had been hoped that eligible clubs in the area would re-join the North Hants League rather than the new unofficial county league and swell numbers. Alas, it was not to be and a valuable stepping stone between junior and county football had been lost.

League Champions

A to Z of Clubs

 
Defunct football leagues in England
Sports leagues established in 1969
1969 establishments in England
Football in Hampshire